Mackenzie Hawkesby (born 13 April 2000) is an Australian soccer player who plays as a midfielder for Sydney FC of the A-League Women.

Club career

Sydney FC
Hawkesby made her senior debut for Sydney FC on the 17th of November 2019 in a 3–0 win against Melbourne Victory.

International career
In June 2022, after an impressive season with Sydney FC, Hawkesby was called up to Australia's senior national team for their upcoming friendlies against Spain and Portugal.

References

2000 births
Living people
Australian women's soccer players
Women's association football defenders
Sydney FC players
Sydney FC (A-League Women) players